Liu Zhen was the son of Liu Sheng, Prince of Zhongshan, and the grandson of Emperor Jing of Han.  According to the Romance of the Three Kingdoms, Liu Zhen was granted the title of Ting Marquis of Lucheng (陆城亭侯) by the Emperor Wu of Han.  In the Han Dynasty, a Marquis was expected to pay an annual tribute of gold to the emperor, which was to be used toward the ritual sacrifices to the gods and ancestors.  Failure to pay this tribute was considered to be an offense meriting the stripping of one's noble rank.  Liu Zhen failed to pay the tribute, and was thus stripped of his Marquis title.  His family remained in Zhuo County, possibly until the time of Liu Bei, who may have been Liu Zhen's descendant. Liu Bei became the ruler of Shu Han in the Three Kingdoms period.

He is not to be confused with Liu Zhen 刘桢, the Eastern Han scholar.

See also
 Shu Han family trees

References

Chinese nobility
Year of birth unknown
Year of death unknown